The Pakistan Atomic Research Reactor or (PARR) are two nuclear research reactors and two other experimental neutron sources located in the PINSTECH Laboratory, Nilore, Islamabad, Pakistan.

In addition a reprocessing facility referred to as New Labs also exists for nuclear weapons research and production.

The first nuclear reactor was supplied and financially constructed by the Government of United States of America in the mid 1960s. The other reactor and reprocessing facility are built and supplied by Pakistan Atomic Energy Commission (PAEC) in the 1970s and 1980s, respectively. Supervised by the United States and International Atomic Energy Agency (IAEA), the first two reactors are subject to IAEA safeguards and its inspections.

History of PARR-Reactors 

The PARR-I Reactor was supplied by the United States government in 1965 under the Atoms for Peace program. The PINSTECH institute was designed by American architect Edward Durrell Stone, when noted Pakistani scientists, Abdus Salam and Ishrat Hussain Usmani travelled to the United States of America in the early 1960s. The first reactor was supplied by the American Machine and Foundry as its contractors, and the first reactor was built by the American nuclear engineer Peter Karter.

In the first stage, reactor building and ancillary facilities were completed with the reactor becoming critical on 21 December 1965. The second stage, consisting of various laboratories, workshop, library and auditorium, became operational in 1974. The facility was last upgraded by PAEC chairman and noted nuclear scientist, Mr. Munir Ahmad Khan in 1989.

PARR-I Reactor 
The PARR-I Reactor was the first reactor that was supplied by American Machine and Foundry. Peter Karter had personally supervised the construction of the reactor. The PARR-I is a swimming pool-type and Materials Test Reactor (MTR) type research reactor. Originally based on a designed to use the Highly enriched uranium (HEU) fuel, the HEU fuel use the ~93% enriched in 235U at a power level of 5 MW. The first reactor went critical on 21 December 1965 under the supervision of Hafeez Qureshi, Dr. M. N. Qazi, Naeem Ahmad Khan and Saleem Rana.

The PARR-I Reactor attained its full power on 22 June 1966. In PARR-I, it is virtually impossible to adopt secure the fresh supplies of the HEU fuel. However, to ensure the continuity of the nuclear fuel, PARR-I was converted to use the ~20% Low-enriched uranium (LEU) from the 235U in October 1991
The nuclear fuel conversion program was led by the PAEC chairman Mr. Munir Ahmad Khan. The reactor was also upgraded from the power level of 5 MW to 10 MW.

The program was carried out to meet demands of higher neutron fluxes for experimental research purposes and the isotope production. The upgraded reactor was also made available to compensate for the decrease in neutron flux due to higher concentration of 238U in the LEU fuel as compared to the HEU fuel. The reactor was made critical on 31 October 1991 under the supervision of Dr. Ishfaq Ahmad and Dr. Iqbal Hussain Qureshi, and attained power level of 10 MW on 7 May 1992. The core configuration attained its equilibrium configuration in February 1995.

PARR-II Reactor 

The PARR-II Reactor is an indigenously designed and constructed reactor owned by the Pakistan Atomic Energy Commission. The PARR-II Reactor's design is similar to Miniature neutron source reactor (MNSR) and SLOWPOKE reactor. The reactor was indigenously designed by the PAEC as the chairman Munir Ahmad Khan and his team of engineers and scientists also led the construction of the reactor. The PARR-II Reactor had gone critical and began operating on 21 January 1974. The PARR-II Reactor is a tank-in-pool reactor with a rated power of 27–30 kW. Same as the first reactor, the reactor is designed to use the High Enrich Uranium (HEU) fuel. The HEU fuel use the ~90% 235U at a power level of 30 kW. The demineralised light water is used as a coolant moderator and the reactor core is reflected by metallic Be4.

A PARR-II consists of a core reactor, control rod, and nuclear reflectors, and it is enclosed in a water-tight cylindrical Al13 alloy vessel. The nuclear reactor core is an under-moderated array with 1H to 235U ratio of temperature of 20 °C and provides a strong Negative temperature coefficient and thermal volume coefficients of reactivity. The PAEC scientists and engineers also built and constructed the nuclear accelerator on 9 April 1989. The particle accelerator is heavily used to conduct research in nuclear technology.

New Labs 

Unlike the PARR-I and PARR-II the New Labs is not subject to IAEA inspections. and is completely different from its parent reactors. It is a plutonium-fuel reprocessing plant and works as a pilot 94Pu reprocessing facility with a capability to use the ~7% 239Pu, to handle the isotopes and use the 86Kr emissions and radiation. It is also a reprocessing plant to change <~7% 239Pu into <~7% weapon-grade 240Pu fuel. New Labs were designed and constructed indigenously by Pakistan Atomic Energy Commission (PAEC) under its chairman Munir Ahmad Khan whereas it project-director was a mechanical engineer, Chaudhry Abdul Majeed. The construction of the facility was led by NESPAK.

In the 1960s PAEC contracted the project with British Nuclear Fuels (BNFL), and Saint-Gobain Techniques Nouvelles (SGN). PAEC engineers and scientists led the initial design for a large-scale reprocessing plant with a capacity to re-process 100 tons of fuel per year, while BNFL and SGN provided funds, technical assistance, and nuclear fuel. However, after the India's Operation Smiling Buddha nuclear test, both British and French consumer companies immediately cancelled their contracts with PAEC.

The plant was completed in 1981 and cold reprocessing tests for producing plutonium took place at New Labs in 1986. The New Labs came into limelight when Pakistan had secretly tested its plutonium weapon-based nuclear device in Kirana Hills. On 30 May 1998, the PAEC scientists, under renowned nuclear physicist Dr. Samar Mubarakmand, had tested a miniaturised nuclear device that is believed to be a Plutonium devices for which plutonium was most likely reprocessed by the Pakistani scientists into weapon-grade at the New Labs. The test yield of a nuclear devices was reported to be 12–40 kt.

Charged Particle Accelerator 
In early 1983, Pakistani nuclear physicist Dr. Samar Mubarakmand developed and established a neutron particle and nuclear accelerator to conduct the research of explosions of nuclear elements and isotopes in a nuclear device. Known as a Charged Particle Accelerator (CPA), the nuclear accelerator is a 250 keV Ion accelerator which can deliver all Gaseous ions such as +H, +N, +O, +He, +Ne, +Ar, +Kr,  +Xe or molecular ions. The accelerator's energy range is highly flexible and ions between 50 and 250 keV can be delivered to a target of dimensions ranging from few mm to many cm.

The particle facility is designed to implantation of 42+Mo, 51+Sn, and 46+Pb ions into steel, friction can be reduced by up to ~50%. During the process of ion implantation, the oxidation is inhibited by suitable ions such as 5+B,20+Ca into metals. The PINSTECH accelerator can be used by mutual arrangement between PINSTECH and industry or any other organisations.

Fast-Neutron Generator 

In 1961, the United States Government led the establishment of ICF-based Fusion power experimental source near at Nilore, before the establishment of PINSTECH Institute. The neutron generator was bought by the PAEC from Texas A&M Nuclear Science Center. The facility is capable of producing mono-energetic neutrons at 3.5–14.7MeV from deuterium-tritium reaction generated by the Fusion power. This fusion experimental devices has capability to capture the low neutron flux on the order of 105 to 108 neutrons per cm2 per second, resulting in nucleosynthesis by the s-process (slow-neutron-capture-process). It is designed and planned to do fast neutron activation for elements such as oxygen and nitrogen as well as some rare earth isotopes.

References

External links 
PARR Reactors
PARR-I
PARR-II
 PARR Nuclear Reactors

Science and technology in Pakistan
Nuclear research reactors
Nuclear technology in Pakistan
Government of Zulfikar Ali Bhutto
Nuclear reprocessing sites
Pakistan Atomic Energy Commission